Oscan is an extinct Indo-European language of southern Italy. The language is in the Osco-Umbrian or Sabellic branch of the Italic languages. Oscan is therefore a close relative of Umbrian. 

Oscan was spoken by a number of tribes, including the Samnites, the Aurunci (Ausones), and the Sidicini. The latter two tribes were often grouped under the name "Osci". The Oscan group is part of the Osco-Umbrian or Sabellic family, and includes the Oscan language and three variants (Hernican, Marrucinian and Paelignian) known only from inscriptions left by the Hernici, Marrucini and Paeligni, minor tribes of eastern central Italy. Adapted from the Etruscan alphabet, the Central Oscan alphabet was used to write Oscan in Campania and surrounding territories from the 5th century BCE until possibly the 1st century CE.

Evidence

Oscan is known from inscriptions dating as far back as the 5th century BCE. The most important Oscan inscriptions are the Tabula Bantina, the Oscan Tablet or Tabula Osca, and the Cippus Abellanus. In Apulia, there is evidence that ancient currency was inscribed in Oscan (dating to before 300 BCE) at Teanum Apulum. Oscan graffiti on the walls of Pompeii indicate its persistence in at least one urban environment well into the 1st century of the common era.

In total, as of 2017, there were 800 found Oscan texts, with a rapid expansion in recent decades. Oscan was written in various scripts depending on time period and location, including the "native" Oscan script, the South Oscan script which was based on Greek, and the ultimately prevailing Roman Oscan script.

Demise
In coastal zones of Southern Italy, Oscan is thought to have survived three centuries of bilingualism with Greek between 400 and 100 BCE, making it "an unusual case of stable societal bilingualism" wherein neither language became dominant or caused the death of the other; however, over the course of the Roman period, both Oscan and Greek would be progressively effaced from Southern Italy, excepting the controversial possibility of Griko representing a continuation of ancient dialects of Greek.
Oscan's usage declined following the Social War. Graffiti in towns across the Oscan speech area indicate it remained in colloquial usage. One piece of evidence that supports the colloquial usage of the language is the presence of Oscan graffiti on walls of Pompeii that were reconstructed after the earthquake of 62 CE, which must therefore have been written between 62 and 79 CE. Other scholars argue that this is not strong evidence for the survival of Oscan as an official language in the area, given the disappearance of public inscriptions in Oscan after Roman colonization. It is possible that both languages existed simultaneously under different conditions, in which Latin was given political, religious, and administrative importance while Oscan was considered a "low" language. This phenomenon is referred to as diglossia with bilingualism. Some Oscan graffiti exists from the 1st century CE, but it is rare to find evidence from Italy of Latin-speaking Roman citizens representing themselves as having non–Latin-speaking ancestors.

General characteristics
Oscan speakers came into close contact with the Latium population. Early Latin texts have been discovered nearby major Oscan settlements. For example, the Garigliano Bowl was found close to Minturnae, less than 40 kilometers from Capua, which was once a large Oscan settlement. Oscan had much in common with Latin, though there are also many striking differences, and many common word-groups in Latin were absent or represented by entirely different forms. For example, Latin volo, velle, volui, and other such forms from the Proto-Indo-European root *wel- ('to will') were represented by words derived from *gher ('to desire'): Oscan herest ('(s)he shall want, (s)he shall desire', German cognate 'begehren', English cognate 'yearn') as opposed to Latin volent (id.). Place was represented by the hapax slaagid (place), which Italian linguist Alberto Manco has linked to a surviving local toponym. Distant cognate of the Latin locus, both derived from Proto-Italic "stlokos".

In phonology too, Oscan exhibited a number of clear differences from Latin: thus, Oscan 'p' in place of Latin 'qu' (Osc. pis, Lat. quis) (compare the similar P-Celtic/Q-Celtic cleavage in the Celtic languages); 'b' in place of Latin 'v'; medial 'f' in contrast to Latin 'b' or 'd' (Osc. mefiai, Lat. mediae).

Oscan is considered to be the most conservative of all the known Italic languages, and among attested Indo-European languages it is rivaled only by Greek in the retention of the inherited vowel system with the diphthongs intact.

Writing system

Alphabet

Oscan was originally written in a specific "Oscan alphabet", one of the Old Italic scripts derived from (or cognate with) the Etruscan alphabet. Later inscriptions are written in the Greek and Latin alphabets.

The "Etruscan" alphabet
The Osci probably adopted the archaic Etruscan alphabet during the 7th century BCE, but a recognizably Oscan variant of the alphabet is attested only from the 5th century BCE; its sign inventory extended over the classical Etruscan alphabet by the introduction of lowered variants of I and U, transcribed as Í and Ú. Ú came to be used to represent Oscan /o/, while U was used for /u/ as well as historical long */oː/, which had undergone a sound shift in Oscan to become ~[uː].

The Z of the native alphabet is pronounced . The letters Ú and Í are "differentiations" of U and I, and do not appear in the oldest writings. The Ú represents an o-sound, and Í is a higher-mid . Doubling of vowels was used to denote length but a long I is written IÍ.

The "Greek" alphabet
Oscan written with the Greek alphabet was identical to the standard alphabet with the addition of two letters: one for the native alphabet's H and one for its V. The letters η and ω do not indicate quantity. At other times, ει and oυ are used to denote diphthongs, in which case o denotes the  sound.

The "Latin" alphabet

Transliteration
When Oscan inscriptions are quoted, it is conventional to transliterate those in the "Oscan" alphabet into Latin boldface, those in the "Latin" alphabet into Latin italics, and those in the "Greek" alphabet into the modern Greek alphabet.  Letters of all three alphabets are represented in lower case.

History of sounds

Vowels
Vowels are regularly lengthened before ns and nct (in the latter of which the n is lost) and possibly before nf and nx as well.
Anaptyxis, the development of a vowel between a liquid or nasal and another consonant, preceding or following, occurs frequently in Oscan; if the other (non-liquid/nasal) consonant precedes, the new vowel is the same as that of the preceding vowel. If the other consonant follows, the new vowel is the same as that of the following vowel.

Monophthongs

A
Short a remains in most positions.
Long ā remains in an initial or medial position. Final ā starts to sound similar to  so that it is written ú or, rarely, u.

E
Short e "generally remains unchanged;" before a labial in a medial syllable, it becomes u or i, and before another vowel, e raises to higher-mid [ẹ], written í.
Long ē similarly raises to higher-mid [ẹ], the sound of written í or íí.

I
Short i becomes written í.
Long ī is spelt with i but when written with doubling as a mark of length with ií.

O
Short o remains mostly unchanged, written ú; before a final -m, o becomes more like u.
Long ō becomes denoted by u or uu.

U
Short u generally remains unchanged; after t, d, n, the sound becomes that of iu. 
Long ū generally remains unchanged; it changed to an ī sound in monosyllables, and may have changed to an ī sound for final syllables.

Diphthongs
The sounds of diphthongs remain unchanged.

Consonants

S
In Oscan, s between vowels did not undergo rhotacism as it did in Latin and Umbrian; but it was voiced, becoming the sound . However, between vowels, the original cluster rs developed either to a simple r with lengthening on the preceding vowel, or to a long rr (as in Latin), and at the end of a word, original rs becomes r just as in Latin. Unlike in Latin, the s is not dropped, either Oscan or Umbrian, from the consonant clusters sm, sn, sl: Umbrian `sesna "dinner,"  Oscan kersnu vs Latin cēna.

Examples of Oscan texts

From the Cippus Abellanus

In Latin:

In English:

From Tabula Bantina

First paragraph 

out of six paragraphs in total, lines 3-8 (the first couple lines are too damaged to be clearly legible):

In Latin: 

In English: 

Notes: Oscan carn- "part, piece" is related to Latin carn- "meat" (seen in English 'carnivore'), from an Indo-European root *ker- meaning 'cut'--apparently the Latin word originally meant 'piece (of meat).' Oscan tangin- "judgement, assent" is ultimately related to English 'think'.

Second paragraph 

= lines 8-13. In this and the following paragraph, the assembly is being discussed in its judiciary function as a court of appeals:

In Latin:

In English:

Third Paragraph

= lines 13-18

In Latin:

In English:

The Testament of Vibius Adiranus 
In Oscan:

In English:

See also
Ancient peoples of Italy

References

Sources

Further reading
Linguistic Outlines:
 Prosdocimi, A.L. 1978. «L’osco». In Lingue e dialetti dell’Italia antica, a cura di Aldo Luigi Prosdocimi, 825–912. Popoli e civiltà dell’Italia antica 6. Roma - Padova: Biblioteca di storia patria.
Studies:
 Planta, R. von 1892-1897.  Grammatik der oskisch-umbrischen Dialekte. 2 voll. Strassburg: K. J. Trubner. 
 Buck, C. D. 1904 [1979/2]. A Grammar of Oscan and Umbrian. Boston: Ginn & Company.
 Cooley, Alison E. 2002. "The survival of Oscan in Roman Pompeii." Becoming Roman, writing Latin? : literacy and epigraphy in the Roman West. Journal of Roman Archaeology. . .
 Fishman, J.A. 1967. "Bilingualism with and without diglossia; diglossia with and without bilingualism." Journal of Social Issues 23, 29-38.
 Pisani, Vittore. 1964. Le lingue dell'Italia antica oltre il Latino. Rosenberg & Sellier. 
 Lejeune, Michel. "Phonologie osque et graphie grecque". In: Revue des Études Anciennes. Tome 72, 1970, n°3-4. pp. 271–316. 
 McDonald, Katherine. 2012. "The Testament of Vibius Adiranus." Journal of Roman Studies, 102, 40-55. .
 Salvucci, Claudio R. 1999. A Vocabulary of Oscan: Including the Oscan and Samnite Glosses. Southampton, PA: Evolution Publishing.
 Untermann, J. 2000. Wörterbuch des Oskisch-Umbrischen. Heidelberg: C. Winter.
 McDonald, Katherine. 2015. Oscan in Southern Italy and Sicily: Evaluating Language Contact in a Fragmentary Corpus. Cambridge: Cambridge University Press. .
 Schrijver, Peter. 2016. "Oscan Love of Rome". Glotta 92 (1): 223–26.
 
 Machajdíková, Barbora; Martzloff, Vincent. "Le pronom indéfini osque pitpit "quicquid" de Paul Diacre à Jacob Balde: morphosyntaxe comparée des paradigmes *kwi- kwi- du latin et du sabellique". In: Graeco-Latina Brunensia. 2016, vol. 21, iss. 1, pp. 73-118. . 
 Petrocchi, A., Wallace, R. 2019. Grammatica delle Lingue Sabelliche dell’Italia Antica. München: LINCOM GmbH. [ed. inglese. 2007]

Texts
 Clackson, James. 2011. The Blackwell history of the Latin language. Geoffrey C. Horrocks. Malden, MA: Wiley-Blackwell. . 
 Janssen, H.H. 1949. Oscan and Umbrian Inscriptions, Leiden.
 Vetter, E. 1953. Handbuch der italischen Dialekte, Heidelberg.
 Rix, H. 2002. Sabellische Texte. Heidelberg: C. Winter.
 Crawford, M. H. et al. 2011. Imagines Italicae. London: Institute of Classical Studies.
 Franchi De Bellis, A. 1988. Il cippo abellano. Universita Degli Studi Di Urbino.
 Del Tutto Palma, Loretta. 1983. La Tavola Bantina (sezione osca): Proposte di rilettura. Vol. 1. Linguistica, epigrafia, filologia italica, Quaderni di lavoro.
 Del Tutto Palma, L. (a cura di) 1996. La tavola di Agnone nel contesto italico. Atti del Convegno di studio (Agnone 13-15 aprile 1994). Firenze: Olschki.
 Franchi De Bellis, Annalisa. 1981. Le iovile capuane. Firenze: L.S. Olschki.
 Murano, Francesca. 2013. Le tabellae defixionum osche. Pisa ; Roma: Serra.
 Decorte, Robrecht. 2016. "Sine dolo malo: The Influence and Impact of Latin Legalese on the Oscan Law of the Tabula Bantina". Mnemosyne 69 (2): 276–91.

External links 

 "Languages and Cultures of Ancient Italy. Historical Linguistics and Digital Models", Project fund by the Italian Ministry of University and Research (P.R.I.N. 2017)
 

 Image of Tabula Batina

Osco-Umbrian languages
Languages attested from the 5th century BC
Languages extinct in the 1st century
Osci
Samnium